The Phoenix Opera is a professional opera company located in Phoenix, Arizona, United States. It is an affiliate member of OPERA America. The company was founded as the Phoenix Metropolitan Opera in 2006 by the artistic director John Massaro and the creative director Gail Dubinbaum. Massaro and Dubinbaum are married and have both had highly successful musical careers, working with such prestigious companies as the Metropolitan Opera. The 2007 inaugural season included only one fully staged opera, Puccini's La Bohème. In 2008/09, the company presented two fully staged productions: Verdi's Aida and Puccini's Tosca. In the 2009/10 season the company presented Carmen and Madama Butterfly conducted by Massaro. In the 2010/11 season the company presented The Magic Flute and La Traviata.

The company performs all of its productions at the Orpheum Theatre. Notable artists to have sung with the company include the soprano Marie Te Hapuku, Fabiana Bravo, Mauro Augustini and Donnie Ray Albert.

References

External links
 Official web site of the Phoenix Opera
 

American opera companies
Music of Phoenix, Arizona
Musical groups established in 2006
Performing arts in Arizona